Årstad Hundred was a hundred in central Halland in southern Sweden.

Parishes
The hundred was divided into the following parishes:

In Falkenberg Municipality
Abild
Asige
Askome
Eftra
Krogsered
Skrea
Slöinge
Vessige
Årstad

I Hylte Municipality:
Drängsered

Sources

Hundreds of Halland